The Mersin Metro is a proposed rapid transit system for the Turkish city of Mersin. Construction is due to begin in January 2022, and take 48 months to complete.

Background
Planning for the metro first began in 2018. Originally planned as a 20km line with 15 stations, the project was revised to reduce costs and the length and number of stations was reduced to 13.4 km and 11 stations, respectively. In October 2020, the city of Mersin announced that 13 companies had submitted bids to build the first metro line. The line will link Mezitli in the southwest with Üçocak in the northeast and include an interchange with the city’s train station. Services are excepted to run at a maximum speed of 80 km/h, offering a total journey time of 23 min.

See also
 Rail transport in Turkey

References

Standard gauge railways in Turkey
Rapid transit in Turkey
Underground rapid transit in Turkey
Transport in Mersin